Mario Schujovitzky (born 24 February 1953) was an Argentine-Israeli footballer who played for Chacarita Juniors and Hapoel Be'er Sheva. He was known as one of the top goalkeepers in Israel at stopping penalty kicks.

Club career 
Schujovitzky made his professional debut with Chacarita Juniors and in 1977, at the age of 24, he arrived in Israel, where he developed the rest of his career until his retirement in 1987.

Career statistics

Club

References

External links
 

1953 births
2021 deaths
Israeli footballers
Argentine footballers
Hapoel Jerusalem F.C. players
Hapoel Be'er Sheva F.C. players
Footballers from Santa Fe, Argentina
Association football goalkeepers